The Republic of Wolves is an indie rock band from Long Island, New York. The band consists of lead singer Mason Maggio, guitarist Christian Van Deurs, bassist Ryan Sean Cullinane, drummer Chris Wall and keyboardist Billy Duprey.

Originally a side project of Maggio and Van Deurs' indie folk band Tigers on Trains, the Republic of Wolves gained popularity when a set of their demos was uploaded online and mistakenly believed to belong to fellow Long Island band Brand New. They have released three albums.

History
During summer 2009, Maggio and Van Deurs were recording the Tigers On Trains album Grandfather at Gregg Andrew Dellarocca's home studio. They began experimenting with a different, heavier and more dynamic style of music with their friends Duprey and Wall and The Republic of Wolves was formed. 

The Republic of Wolves has notable influences from other Long Island bands such as Brand New, Taking Back Sunday, Straylight Run, Glassjaw and As Tall As Lions. This influence was most obvious when clips of three The Republic of Wolves demos were posted onto YouTube as demos of Brand New songs from their then upcoming album Daisy. Initially, many Brand New fans could not tell whether these demos were legitimate or not. The band has said that they had no part in this incident, and when they found out about the faux demos they contacted the CEO of AbsolutePunk, Jason Tate, and the truth was revealed.

The band's debut EP His Old Branches was named "the best EP to be released in 2009" by AbsolutePunk. Punknews.org has noted that there are "some moments of brilliant restraint in their songs". The Republic of Wolves were placed on a list of the "Top 10 Indie Bands" in Substream Music Press magazine, in which they were described as having "dark sounds, slowly but forcefully delivered vocals, and aggressively smart lyrics."

On March 15, 2010, The Republic of Wolves, with the help of 410 BC, Vintage Hustle Records and Simple Stereo, held a contest in which they invited fans to cover any one of their songs from the EP His Old Branches, awarding prizes to the top entries.

Their first full-length album, Varuna, was released on November 30, 2010. The CD was self-released by the band and the vinyl was released by Simple Stereo.

On September 11, 2010, the band announced an upcoming extended play called The Cartographer, which was released digitally and on vinyl (by Simple Stereo). on January 1, 2011. On April 3, the drummer Wall announced that he was leaving the band under good terms.

Maggio graduated from Long Island's Stony Brook University in 2012 and soon after moved to the West Coast.

On January 6, 2013, the band uploaded a new track entitled "Consequence" on SoundCloud, with the description stating that it would appear on their upcoming album to be released "later this year". The song did not appear on the standard version of the album, however. On January 11, 2014 the band made the track available for free download on the Simple Stereo website.

In September 2014, the band rejoined with the original drummer, Wall, as they prepared for that year's upcoming Warped Tour.

Their third album Shrine was released in 2018.

In 2020, Maggio participated on Jeopardy!, becoming a two-time winner.

Band members
Current
Mason Maggio – guitar, vocals (2009–present)
Billy Duprey – keyboard, percussion, vocals (2009–present)
Christian Van Deurs – lead guitar, backing vocals (2009–present)
Chris Wall – drums (2009–2011, 2014–present)
Ryan Sean Cullinane – bass guitar

Past
Gregg Andrew Dellarocca – guitar, vocals (2009–2015)
David Kaplan – bass guitar, vocals

Discography

Studio albums
Varuna (Simple Stereo (vinyl), 2010)
No Matter How Narrow (Simple Stereo (vinyl), 2013)
Shrine (2018)

EPs
His Old Branches (Vintage Hustle Records, 2009)
The Cartographer (Simple Stereo (vinyl), 2011)
Empty Vessels (Simple Stereo (digital), 2013)

Compilation albums
In The House Of Dust (Simple Stereo, 2011)

Singles
"Cardinals" (Simple Stereo, 2010)
"Oarsman" (self-released, 2010)
"Home" (self-released, 2011)
"Consequence" (self-released, 2013)
"Spare Key" (self-released, 2013)

References

External links
 
 The Republic Of Wolves on YouTube
 The Republic Of Wolves profile on AbsolutePunk

Indie rock musical groups from New York (state)
Musical groups established in 2009
Musical groups from Long Island
2009 establishments in New York (state)